Henry Clayton Metcalf (February 22, 1867 – August 1942) was an early American organizational theorist, Professor of Political Science at Tufts College in Massachusetts and Chairman of Tufts College, known from his publications on management with Ordway Tead and Lyndall Urwick.

Biography 
Born in Warsaw, Illinois to Thomas B. and Mary A. (Chambers) Metcalf obtained his AB degree at the Illinois State Normal University in 1894, and his PhD from the Humboldt University of Berlin in 1897.

In Autumn 1899 Metcalf was appointed College Professor at Tufts College in Massachusetts, where early 1900s he first worked with Mary Parker Follett. In the 1910s he was also lecturer at Garland School of Homemaking in Boston, and at the New York Edison School. In 1914 he explained, that he had spent several "summers in travel in Europe and the United States, studying methods of industry and employers' welfare institutions." In the 1910s he was also chairman of Tufts College, and until 1919 Cornelia M. Jackson Professorship of in Political Science at Tufts' Department of Economics. In 1917 he took leave of absence from his duties at Tufts College and visited industrial plants and educational institutions.

In 1919 Metcalf moved New York, where he was appointed Professor of Economics at the New School for Social Research, and Director of the Bureau of Personnel Administration.

Work

Personnel administration (1920) 
In the Preface of Personnel administration: its principles and practice (1920) Tead and Metcalf explained, that the purpose of that book as "to set forth the principles and the best prevailing practice in the field of the administration of human relations in industry. It is addressed to employers, personnel executives and employment managers, and to students of personnel administration whether they are in schools of business administration or already in industry in some executive capacity." They hope that it "will have value, also, for all - managers, workers, consumers - who are interested to advance right human relations in industry, and to secure a productivity which is due to willing human cooperation, interest and creative power."

The field of administrative activity covered by this book includes all those efforts usually included in personnel management; employment, health and safety, training, personnel research, service features and joint relations. And Tead and Metcalf seek, also, to show the relation of the personnel problems of each corporation to those of its industry as whole, by considering in conclusion the activities of employers' associations and the dealings which they may have with organizations of workers on a district or national scale.

Publications 
 Metcalf, Henry C. Industrial and social justice; trial outline and bibliography. 1912.
 Tead, Ordway, and Henry Clayton Metcalf. Personnel administration: its principles and practice. No. 18. McGraw-Hill Book Company, inc., 1920.
 Metcalf, Henry Clayton, ed. Business management as a profession. AW Shaw Company, 1927.
 Metcalf, Henry Clayton, ed. Business leadership. I. Pitman & sons, 1931.
 Tead, Ordway, and Henry Clayton Metcalf. Labor relations under the Recovery act. No. 41. Whittlesey House, 1933.
 Metcalf, Henry C., and Lyndall Urwick, eds. Dynamic administration: the collected papers of Mary Parker Follett. Vol. 3. Routledge, 1942/2003.

References

External links 
 

1867 births
1942 deaths
American business theorists
Harvard University alumni
Tufts University faculty
People from Warsaw, Illinois